The Chicago Americans was an American soccer club based in Chicago, Illinois that was a member of the American Soccer League. They only played a few games in their only season. During their time they were also known as Chicago Inter and Chicago Hercules.

Year-by-year

American Soccer League (1933–1983) teams
A
Defunct soccer clubs in Illinois
1972 establishments in Illinois
1972 disestablishments in Illinois
Association football clubs established in 1972
Association football clubs disestablished in 1972